PS Richard Young was a passenger vessel built for the Great Eastern Railway in 1871.

History

The ship was built by J & W Dudgeon in Cubitt Town London for the Great Eastern Railway and added to the fleet in 1871.

Named after a director of the railway company, she was used for their Harwich to Rotterdam and Antwerp services.

In 1890 she was converted from paddle steamer to screw steamer by Earle's Shipbuilding and afterwards known as Brandon.

She was scrapped in 1905.

References

1871 ships
Steamships of the United Kingdom
Paddle steamers of the United Kingdom
Ships built on the River Thames
Ships of the Great Eastern Railway